Beverly Klass (born November 8, 1956) is an American professional golfer. She joined the LPGA Tour in 1976, and in 1984 she achieved career-best finishes at the West Virginia LPGA Classic and the San Jose Classic, with a second-place tie in both 1984 events. She also had a 5th-place finish at the 1982 Peter Jackson Classic. Klass currently holds the record for being the youngest person to ever compete in the U.S. Women's Open.

As a child, Klass was a golf phenom. At the age of eight, she won the 1964 National PeeWee Golf Championship by 65 strokes. During the 1965 LPGA Tour season, as a nine-year-old, Klass won $31. Over the next six years, after having her amateur status reinstated, she won over 25 city and state tournaments in California. In 1967, at the age of 10 years, 7 months, and 21 days, Klass became the youngest player to ever compete in the U.S. Women's Open.

References

External links

American female golfers
LPGA Tour golfers
Golfers from California
1956 births
Living people
21st-century American women